John Walter Morris (January 31, 1880 – August 2, 1961) was a professional baseball player.  He was a shortstop for one season (1908) with the St. Louis Cardinals.  For his career, he compiled a .178 batting average in 73 at bats, with two runs batted in.

An alumnus of the University of Texas at Austin, he was born in Rockwall, Texas and died in Dallas, Texas at the age of 81.

External links

1880 births
1961 deaths
Major League Baseball shortstops
St. Louis Cardinals players
Minor league baseball managers
Beaumont Millionaires players
San Antonio Bronchos players
Charleston Sea Gulls players
Savannah Indians players
Memphis Turtles players
Birmingham Barons players
Fort Worth Panthers players
Texas Longhorns baseball players
Baseball players from Texas
People from Rockwall, Texas